Cephalops perspicuus is a species of fly in the family Pipunculidae.

Distribution
Great Britain, Netherlands.

References

Pipunculidae
Insects described in 1907
Diptera of Europe
Taxa named by Johannes C. H. de Meijere